Gonzalo Felipe Barriga Ahumada (born 21 June 1984) is a Chilean footballer who currently plays for Primera División club Unión La Calera as a midfielder. He was titled as engineer after attending DuocUC.

Club career
After ending his career of engineering at DuocUC, Barriga was discovered by the Dutchman Jorrit Smink (in that time Deportes Melipilla coach) and convinced him to play at homogeneous city-based team.

In January 2013, Barriga joined O'Higgins along his Unión Española teammate Braulio Leal.

On 10 December 2013, he won the 2013–14 Apertura with O'Higgins. During the tournament, he played in 17 matches and scored one goal in a win 2–1 against Deportes Antofagasta.

In 2014, he won the Supercopa de Chile against Deportes Iquique.

He participated with the club in the 2014 Copa Libertadores where they faced Deportivo Cali, Cerro Porteño and Lanús, being third and being eliminated in the group stage.

Honors

Club
O'Higgins
Primera División de Chile (1): 2013 Apertura
Supercopa de Chile (1): 2014

Individual
Medalla Santa Cruz de Triana: 2014

References

External links

1984 births
Living people
Chilean footballers
Association football forwards
Unión Española footballers
O'Higgins F.C. footballers
Unión La Calera footballers
Deportes Melipilla footballers
Santiago Wanderers footballers
Chilean Primera División players
Footballers from Santiago